The Krag-Juel-Vind-Frijs cabinet was the government of Denmark from 6 November 1865 to 28 May 1870.

List of ministers and portfolios
The cabinet consisted of these ministers:

References

1865 establishments in Denmark
1870 disestablishments in Denmark
Frijs